The following is an alphabetical list of members of the United States House of Representatives from the state of Louisiana.

Current representatives 
As of May 2021

 : Steve Scalise (R) (since 2008)
 : Troy Carter (D) (since 2021)
 : Clay Higgins (R) (since 2017)
 : Mike Johnson (R) (since 2017)
 : Julia Letlow (R) (since 2021)
 : Garret Graves (R) (since 2015)

List of members

See also

List of United States senators from Louisiana
United States congressional delegations from Louisiana
Louisiana's congressional districts

References 

House of Representatives List of Members (alphabetical by last name)

Louisiana
United States representatives
United States representatives